Charalambos Andreou (born 16 June 1967) is a Cypriot former international football striker.

He started and ended his career in Nea Salamis Famagusta FC. He had left only for two seasons to play for Anorthosis Famagusta.

All-time top scorer of Nea Salamina with more than 200 goals in all competitions

External links
 

1967 births
Living people
Cypriot footballers
Cyprus international footballers
Greek Cypriot people
Association football forwards
Nea Salamis Famagusta FC players
Anorthosis Famagusta F.C. players
Cypriot First Division players
People from Famagusta